Cigarman is the name of both a comic strip and the hero of the strip. It was published on the back page of Smoke Magazine  from 1997 to 1998.  Cigarman was written by Sam Gross, and drawn by Randy Jones.

Origin
Bitten by a radioactive hornworm (Manduca sexta), wealthy Durham Lonsdale becomes able to transform himself into a gigantic flying cigar, simply by saying Havana backwards (Anavah). Lonsdale lives in Megaburgh, as a "fabulously wealthy" socialite (a parody of Batman).

Other characters
 Commissioner McGraft
 Fenster, McGraft's nephew
 Clipperlips
 Holly Honeybreath, Mayor of San Franallison
 Carlos the Old Cigarmaker
 Manuelo, Carlos' crossdressing nephew
 George Steinblunder, owner of the Megaburgh Puff Adders

Stories

Part I
Appeared in Smoke, Spring 1997 issue

Origin story

Part II
Appeared in Smoke, Summer 1997 issue

Cigarman's arch-nemesis, Clipperlips, appears for the first time. He nearly defeats Cigarman, with the help of liquified blue mold, but Carlos 'the old cigarmaker' saves him.

Part III
Appeared in Smoke, Fall 1997 issue

Bank robbers flee to San Franallison, where Cigarman is unwelcome. He disguises himself as "Vibrator Girl" and lures them back into Megaburgh.

Part IV
Appeared in Smoke, Winter 1997 issue

Colonel Kootz and the Heart of Darkness Militia steal all of the Pentagon's cigars and declare independence. Cigarman regains the cigars with the help of the AFT (American Federation of Teachers).

Part V
Appeared in Smoke, Spring 1998 issue

Cigarman's arch-nemesis, Clipperlips, returns to threaten Megaburgh's ballpark, Puff Adder Stadium. Cigarman defeats him with a clever subterfuge and his secret Oriental training.

References 

American comic strips
1997 comics debuts
1998 comics endings
Parody superheroes
Parody comics
Comic strips set in the United States